Lee Hyun-Min (born July 9, 1984) is a South Korean football player. (formerly Ulsan Hyundai FC and Gwangju Sangmu FC).

Career statistics 
As of end of 2009 season

See also
Football in South Korea
List of football clubs in South Korea

References

1984 births
Living people
Association football defenders
South Korean footballers
Ulsan Hyundai FC players
Gimcheon Sangmu FC players
K League 1 players
Korea National League players